Mayhem Festival 2013 was the sixth annual Mayhem Festival. Dates were announced on January 28, 2013, and lineup announced March 18, 2013. It was the first year that the Mayhem Festival had four stages.

Polish death metal band Behemoth were scheduled to perform but announced on June 5 that they were sitting out of the tour due to drummer Inferno taking ill and needing appendix surgery.

Mayhem Festival 2013 lineup

Mainstage
 Rob Zombie
 Five Finger Death Punch
 Mastodon
 Amon Amarth

Jägermeister Stage
 Machine Head
 Job for a Cowboy
 Butcher Babies
 Battlecross
 Huntress

Musician's Institute Stage
 Children of Bodom
 Scorpion Child
 Emmure
 Born of Osiris
 Motionless in White
 Attika 7
 Thrown Into Exile

Dates

<ref name=autogenerated1

References

Mayhem Festival by year
2013 in American music
2013 music festivals
2013 festivals in the United States
June 2013 events in the United States
July 2013 events in the United States
August 2013 events in the United States